Jerry White may refer to:

 Jerry White (activist) (born 1963), co-founder of the Landmine Survivors Network
 Jerry White (criminal) (1948–1995), criminal executed in Florida
 Jerry White (baseball) (born 1952), player and coach in Major League Baseball
 Jerry White (Navigators) (born 1937), President Emeritus and Chairman of the U.S. Board of Directors of The Navigators
 Jerry White (socialist) (born 1959), presidential candidate for the Socialist Equality Party and reporter for the World Socialist Web Site
 Jerry White (historian), British historian specialising in the history of London
 Son of Perry White, in the fictional Superman universe

See also
Gerry White (1943–2008), businessman
Jeremy White (disambiguation)
Jeremiah White (disambiguation)
Jerome White (disambiguation)
Gerald White (born 1964), American football player